Frank Schröder (born 6 March 1962 in Altenburg) is an East German cross-country skier who competed in the early 1980s. He won a bronze medal in the 4 × 10 km relay at the 1982 FIS Nordic World Ski Championships (Tied with Finland). Schröder also finished 15th in the 15 km event at those same championships. He also competed at the 1984 Winter Olympics.

He has created tone arms and handmade audiophile tonearms.

Cross-country skiing results
All results are sourced from the International Ski Federation (FIS).

Olympic Games

World Championships
 1 medal – (1 bronze)

World Cup

Season standings

Team podiums
1 podium

Note:  Until the 1999 World Championships, World Championship races were included in the World Cup scoring system.

References

External links

1962 births
Living people
East German male cross-country skiers
People from Altenburg
FIS Nordic World Ski Championships medalists in cross-country skiing
Sportspeople from Thuringia
Olympic cross-country skiers of East Germany
Cross-country skiers at the 1984 Winter Olympics